Village Reconstruction Organization is a non-governmental organization in Guntur, Andhra Pradesh, India. It supports structurally weak, impoverished, and unregistered villages in the coastal regions of Southeast India. Since 1969, it has helped rebuild 505 of these villages, which are often destroyed by natural catastrophes. It also helps villagers through expert advice and funding for the creation of training and health centers, schools, homes for the elderly and children, and programs for the support of women. The organization was founded by Belgian Jesuit Michael A. Windey and is supported largely by European organizations and donor cities.

The organization assists with the construction of villages as well as facilities within the villages: schools and skills training centers, health clinics, childcare and community centres, and homes for children and homes for the elderly, especially among the dalits.

Bibliography 
 Josef Hainz. (Hrsg.):  Feuer muß brennen. Dörfer für Indien.. For Michael A. Windey, SJ, on the occasion of his 75th birthday on 28 April 1996, by his friends in Europe. Hardcover, Kelkheim-Eppenhain, self publisher, 2nd ed. (1996).
 Sustainable Development. Theoretische Konzeption und Fallbeispiel.. Seminar work by Tobias Schmitt, University of Tübingen, geographical institute (SS 1997), available via VRO Deutschland eV.
 Felix Duffner: Nutzung der Wasserkraft durch Wasserräder. Institute for Fluid Dynamics and Flow Machines at the University of Fridericana, Karlsruhe (TH), August 1993, available through VRO Deutschland eV.

References

External links 
 

Development charities based in India
Community-building organizations
Homelessness charities
Jesuit development centres
Organizations established in 1971
1971 establishments in Andhra Pradesh